Hiram Williams may refer to:

 Hank Williams, musician
 Hiram D. Williams, painter and University of Florida professor